Qaiser is an Arabic surname and given name that may refer to

Given name 
Qaiser Abbas (born 1982), Pakistani cricketer 
Qaiser Ali (born 1983), Canadian cricket player
Rao Qaiser Ali Khan, Pakistani politician
Qaiser Ashraf (born 1994), Pakistani cricketer 
Qaiser Hussain (born 1959), Pakistani former cricketer
Qaiser Khan (born 1971), Indian politician
Qaiser Mushtaq (born 1954), Pakistani mathematician and academic
Qaiser Naqvi (born 1958), Pakistani actress
Qaiser Rashid Khan (born 1961), Pakistani jurist 
Qaiser Shehzad (born 1986), Pakistani cricketer
Qaiser Ahmed Sheikh (born 1946), Pakistani politician
Qaiser Waheed (born 1966), Pakistani former cricketer

Family name 
Asad Qaiser (born 1969), Pakistani politician
Azhar Shah Qaiser (1920–1985), Indian Islamic scholar, journalist and writer
Ejaz Qaiser (1952–2020), Pakistani singer
Farooq Qaiser (1945–2021), Pakistani artist, newspaper columnist, TV show director, puppeteer, script writer, and voice actor
Iqbal Qaiser (born 1999), Pakistani Punjabi writer, historian and cultural activist
Jamal A. Qaiser (born 1972), Pakistani-German international award-winning author, businessman and political advisor
Khalil Qaiser (died 1966), Pakistani film director, producer and screenwriter
Sohail Qaiser (1965–2016), Pakistani squash player
Zain Qaiser, British student
Surnames of Pakistani origin
Arabic-language names
Urdu-language surnames